The Men's snowboard cross competition at the FIS Freestyle Ski and Snowboarding World Championships 2021 was held on 11 February 2021. A qualification was held on 9 February.

Qualification
The qualification was held on 9 February at 10:45.

Elimination round

1/8 finals

Heat 1

Heat 3

Heat 5

Heat 7

Heat 2

Heat 4

Heat 6

Heat 8

Quarterfinals

Heat 1

Heat 3

Heat 2

Heat 4

Semifinals

Heat 1

Heat 2

Finals

Small final

Big final

References

Men's snowboard cross